Stuartfield is a small inland village in the Buchan area of Aberdeenshire, Scotland, situated  south of Old Deer. It was formerly known as New Crichie, and the name is still used by locals as illustrated by the village association website being crichie.org. The name Crichie (Crechy) derives from the Gaelic word for clay.

Services
Stuartfield has many services for the locals such as a primary School, toddler group and preschool, Ewen Morrice the butcher as well as the post office counter, a Nisa grocery store, the MGB garage, a garden machinery shop, a massage and Cranio-Sacral therapist, Chinese restaurant/takeaway, childminders and a public park which boasts a bowling green, football pitch and tennis court.

Activities
The village has many activities to offer for children and adults alike. Such as Highland Dancing, Woman's Badminton, Rainbows, The Community Association and The Pleasure park Committee, and of course the local pub "Steelies Bar". Stuartfield also has a Bowling Club situated on the site of the Pleasure Park.

History
Historically Stuartfield was known as New Crichie, which was founded in 1763, not to be confused with the other Crichies near Inverurie or Fyvie which are both on hilltops unlike Stuartfield.

References

Sources
Stuartfield in the Gazetteer for Scotland.
Historical overview of Stuartfield in the Gazetteer for Scotland.

Villages in Aberdeenshire
Tumuli in Scotland